Stanley Reiter (April 26, 1925 – August 9, 2014) was an American author, economist, and Emeritus Professor at Northwestern University. Reiter was a leading pioneer in the field of mechanism design.

In 2006, he and the 2007 Nobel prize-winning economist Leonid Hurwicz authored the book Designing Economic Mechanisms.

Education 
Reiter completed his A.B. with honors in economics from Queens College in 1947. He then completed his M.A. (1950) and Ph.D. in economics (1955) from the University of Chicago.

Career 
From 1949 to 1954, he was associated with Stanford University as an instructor and a research associate. From 1954 to 1967, he was at the faculty of Purdue University. He joined the faculty at Northwestern University in 1967.

In 1960 Reiter coined the term Cliometrics.

Reiter is a leading pioneer in the field of mechanism design. In 2006, he and the 2007 Nobel prize-winning economist Leonid Hurwicz authored the book Designing Economic Mechanisms.

Reiter is a fellow of the Econometric Society, the American Association for the Advancement of Science, and the American Academy of Arts and Sciences.

He died in 2014, and is survived by his wife Nina to whom he was married for 70 years, and children Carla and Frank.

Selected bibliography

Books

Journal articles 
  Cowles Commission Discussion Paper: Economics No. 2112, (pdf).

References

External links 
 Personal webpage of Stanley Reiter
 Information about: Stanley Reiter

1925 births
2014 deaths
21st-century American non-fiction writers
20th-century American economists
21st-century American economists
Northwestern University faculty
Purdue University faculty
University of Chicago alumni
Fellows of the Econometric Society